Hugo Alberto Barrientos (born 3 January 1977 in Comodoro Rivadavia) is a retired Argentine football midfielder and current football coach.

Career
Barrientos started his playing career in 1994 with C.A.I in the lower leagues of Argentine football.

In 2000 Barrientos joined Atlético de Rafaela of the 2nd division and in 2002-2003 the club won the division and obtained promotion to the Argentine Primera.

Atlético was relegated after one season, but Barrientos stayed in the Argentine Primera Division, playing for Olimpo de Bahía Blanca and then Instituto de Córdoba.

In 2006 Barrientos signed for Huracán and was part of the squad that won promotion to the Primera at the end of the 2006-2007 season. Barrientos has served as the on-pitch captain of Huracán on several occasions.

In 2009 Barrientos was released by Huracán, he then moved to Rosario to join Newell's Old Boys.

Titles

References

External links
 Football-Lineups player profile
 
 

1977 births
Living people
People from Comodoro Rivadavia
Argentine footballers
Association football midfielders
Comisión de Actividades Infantiles footballers
Atlético de Rafaela footballers
Olimpo footballers
Instituto footballers
All Boys footballers
Club Atlético Huracán footballers
Newell's Old Boys footballers
Club Atlético Platense footballers
Argentine Primera División players
Doping cases in association football